Mizanur Rahman Manu is a Bangladesh Awami League politician and the former Member of Parliament of Dinajpur-4.

Career
Manu was elected to parliament from Dinajpur-4 as a Bangladesh Awami League candidate in 1991 and 1996. He is a former whip of the parliament of Bangladesh.

References

Awami League politicians
Living people
5th Jatiya Sangsad members
7th Jatiya Sangsad members
Year of birth missing (living people)